The 1968–69 Ohio Bobcats men's basketball team represented Ohio University as a member of the Mid-American Conference in the college basketball season of 1968–69. The team was coached by Jim Snyder and for the first time played their home games at the recently constructed Convocation Center. The Bobcats finished with a record of 17–9 and finished second in the MAC regular season with a conference record of 9–3. They were invited to the 1969 National Invitation Tournament.  There they defeated West Texas State before losing to Tennessee in the second round.

Schedule

|-
!colspan=9 style=| Regular Season

|-
!colspan=9 style=| National Invitation Tournament

Source:

Statistics

Team Statistics
Final 1968–69 Statistics

Source

Player statistics

Source

References

Ohio Bobcats men's basketball seasons
Ohio
Ohio
Ohio Bobcats men's basketball
Ohio Bobcats men's basketball